The following is a list of fishes present in the Colombian Magdalena River.

A 
 Abramites eques
 Acestrocephalus anomalus
 Aequidens pulcher
 Ancistrus caucanus
 Ancistrus tolima
 Ancistrus triradiatus
 Andinoacara latifrons
 Argopleura magdalenensis
 Astroblepus homodon
 Astroblepus santanderensis 
 Astyanax caucanus
 Astyanax filiferus	
 Astyanax magdalenae
 Astyanax orthodus

B 
 Brachyhypopomus occidentalis
 Brycon labiatus
 Brycon moorei
 Brycon rubricauda
 Bryconamericus caucanus
 Bunocephalus colombianus

C 
 Caquetaia kraussii
 Carlastyanax aurocaudatus
 Centrochir crocodili
 Cetopsorhamdia boquillae
 Cetopsorhamdia molinae 	
 Cetopsorhamdia nasus
 Chaetostoma brevilabiatum
 Chaetostoma thomsoni
 Characidium caucanum
 Creagrutus guanes
 Creagrutus magdalenae
 Creagrutus nigrostigmatus
 Ctenolucius hujeta
 Curimata mivartii
 Cynodonichthys elegans
 Magdalena rivulus (Cynodonichthys magdalenae)
 Cynopotamus magdalenae
 Cyphocharax magdalenae

D 
 Dasyloricaria filamentosa
 Dasyloricaria seminuda
 Dupouyichthys sapito

E 
 Eigenmannia virescens
 Eremophilus mutisii

F 
 Farlowella yarigui

G 
 Gasteropelecus maculatus
 Genycharax tarpon
 Geophagus steindachneri
 Gephyrocharax caucanus
 Gephyrocharax martae
 Gilbertolus alatus
 Grundulus bogotensis

H 
 Hemibrycon antioquiae
 Hemibrycon cardalensis
 Hemibrycon decurrens
 Hemibrycon fasciatus
 Hemibrycon tolimae
 Hexanematichthys bonillai 	
 Hoplosternum magdalenae	
 Hyphessobrycon panamensis 	
 Hyphessobrycon proteus 	
 Hypostomus hondae
 Hypostomus winzi

I 
 Ichthyoelephas longirostris (Steindachner, 1879)
 Imparfinis nemacheir

K 
 Kronoheros umbriferus

L 	
 Lasiancistrus carnegiei
 Lasiancistrus caucanus
 Lasiancistrus volcanensis
 Lebiasina floridablancaensis	
 Leporinus muyscorum
 Liposarcus multiradiatus

M 
 Megalonema xanthum

N 
 New Granada sea catfish (Notarius bonillai)

P 
 Panaque cochliodon
 Paravandellia phaneronema
 Piabucina pleurotaenia
 Pimelodus blochii Valenciennes, 1840 
 Plagioscion surinamensis
 Poecilia caucana
 Potamotrygon magdalenae
 Prochilodus magdalenae
 Pseudocetopsis othonops
 Pseudopimelodus schultzi
 Pseudoplatystoma magdaleniatum

R 
 Rhamdia quelen 
 Rineloricaria magdalenae
 Roeboides dayi

S 
 Saccoderma hastatus 	
 Salminus affinis
 Sorubim cuspicaudus
 Sorubim lima
 Sternopygus macrurus	
 Sturisoma aureum
 Sturisomatichthys leightoni

T 
 Trachelyopterus insignis
 Trachelyopterus peloichthys 	
 Triportheus magdalenae

X
 Xyliphius magdalenae

Z 
 gilded catfish (Zungaro zungaro)

References

External links 
 Freshwater Fish Species in Magdalena River - Mongabay.com

Fishes
Fish
Magdalena River
Fish